Soberanes is a surname. Notable people with the surname include:

Ana Sofía Soberanes (born 1977), Mexican rower
José Luis Soberanes (born 1950), Mexican lawyer
Juan Soberanes (born 1968), Mexican boxer